Guling is a town of Yunyang County, Chongqing, China. , it has one residential community and 7 villages under its administration.

References

Township-level divisions of Chongqing
Yunyang County